Montgomery County is a county in the U.S. state of Indiana. As of the 2020 United States census, it had a population of 37,936. Its county seat is Crawfordsville. The county is divided into eleven townships which provide local services.

Montgomery County comprises the Crawfordsville, IN Micropolitan Statistical Area.

History

Early history and settlement
The earliest known inhabitants of the area that would become Montgomery County were the Mound Builders, Native Americans who built large earthen mounds, two of which were assumed to have been constructed in southeastern Franklin Township. However, research in the 1990s determined that those mounds were probably natural rather than human-made formations. Subsequent Native American tribes occupied the area until as late as 1832.

The first white settler in the area was William Offield, earlier of Tennessee, who arrived in 1821 with his wife Jennie (née Laughlin) and one child and settled near the confluence of Offield Creek and Sugar Creek, about five miles (8 km) southwest of present Crawfordsville. The first land in the county to be purchased from the government was a tract in Scott Township sold to John Loop on July 23, 1822; many more tracts were entered in subsequent months, most in Union Township. The area's settlers mostly came from Kentucky and Ohio, with others arriving from Tennessee, Virginia and the Carolinas.

Montgomery County was established by an act of the Indiana state legislature passed on December 21, 1822, which defined the county's boundaries and provided for the organization of its government. It was formed from parts of Wabash New Purchase attached to Parke and Putnam Counties. The county was named for Richard Montgomery, an American Revolutionary War general killed on December 31, 1775, while attempting to capture Quebec City in the Battle of Quebec. The first county election was held on March 1, 1823, with 61 voters participating to elect the first three county commissioners — William Offield, James Blevins and John McCollough — who then ordered that the first jail and courthouse be built.

Beginning on December 24, 1824, a large land sale was held for several days at the United States Land Office on Crawfordville's North Water Street, during which a large number of the area's tracts were sold at auction. The money raised from the sale, mostly in the form of gold and silver, was packed into kegs, hauled by wagon to Louisville, carried by boat up the Ohio River, and eventually to Washington, D.C. Settlement increased substantially during the subsequent year.

Courthouses
Montgomery County's first courthouse was ordered on June 28, 1823, to be made "of good hewed logs... to be twenty-six feet long; two stories high, lower story nine feet from floor to joist; upper to be seven feet to roof". Eliakam Ashton won the contract to construct the building on Crawfordville's Main Street; he finished it in August 1824 at a cost of $295. In 1825 a contract was issued to Henry Ristine to cut trees and pick up chips from under the courthouse so that "hogs would not find a comfortable place in which to make their beds".

A more substantial structure was ordered in 1831, the contract for its construction being awarded to John Hughes for $3,420. The result was completed in 1833, a two-story, 40x40 foot brick building surmounted by a cupola, later supplemented by separate one-story buildings erected to the north and east as wings of the main structure. The building stood on the current public square until 1875, when it was removed.

The third and current Montgomery County courthouse was the first courthouse designed by George W. Bunting of Indianapolis; it is one of six of his Indiana courthouses still standing. Bunting had served as a colonel in the Confederacy during the Civil War before establishing himself in Indianapolis; General Lew Wallace, who was on the Union side during the War and was a resident of Montgomery County, spoke at the dedication of the cornerstone in 1875. The building was constructed by McCormack and Sweeney of Columbus, Indiana at a cost of $150,000, and was completed in 1876.

The cornerstone contains an embedded copper box of memorable items, including the key to the old courthouse and a Henry VIII coin.

Geography
The terrain of Montgomery County consists of low rolling hills, completely devoted to agriculture or municipal uses. It is drained by Sugar Creek, which runs toward the west-southwest through the center of the county. The county's highest point is the southeast county line below New Ross, at 930' (283 m) ASL.

Adjacent counties

 Tippecanoe - north
 Clinton - northeast
 Boone - east
 Hendricks - southeast
 Putnam - south
 Parke - southwest
 Fountain - west

City
 Crawfordsville

Towns

 Alamo
 Darlington
 Ladoga
 Linden
 New Market
 New Richmond
 New Ross
 Waveland
 Waynetown
 Wingate

Census-designated place
 Lake Holiday

Other unincorporated places

 Ames
 Balhinch
 Beckville
 Bowers
 Browns Valley
 Cherry Grove
 Darlington Woods
 Deer's Mill
 Elmdale
 Fiskville
 Garfield
 Hibernia
 Kirkpatrick
 Lapland
 Linnsburg
 Mace
 Manchester
 North Union
 Parkersburg
 Shannondale
 Smartsburg
 Taylor Corner
 Wesley
 Whitesville
 Yountsville

Extinct towns
 Binford
 Fredericksburg
 Troutman

Townships

 Brown
 Clark
 Coal Creek
 Franklin
 Madison
 Ripley
 Scott
 Sugar Creek
 Union
 Walnut
 Wayne

Protected areas
 Shades State Park (also in Parke and Fountain counties)

Transportation

Major highways

Railroads
 CSX Transportation

Airport
 KCFJ - Crawfordsville Regional Airport

Montgomery County is served by the Crawfordsville Regional Airport (KCFJ). Located four miles south-southwest of Crawfordsville, the airport handles some 6400 annual operations, nearly all general aviation (some air taxi). The airport has a 4,504 foot asphalt runway with approved GPS and NDB approaches (Runway 4-22).

Bridges
Two historic covered bridges, the Darlington and the Deer's Mill, are in the county.

Climate and weather

Government

The county government is a constitutional body granted specific powers by the Constitution of Indiana and the Indiana Code. The county council, the legislative branch of the county government, controls spending and revenue collection. Representatives are elected from county districts. The council members serve four-year terms and are responsible for setting salaries, the annual budget and special spending. The council also has limited authority to impose local taxes, in the form of an income and property tax that is subject to state level approval, excise taxes and service taxes.

The executive body of the county is made of a board of commissioners. The commissioners are elected county-wide, in staggered four-year terms. One commissioner serves as president. The commissioners execute the county's legislative acts, collecting revenue and managing the county's government.

The county maintains a small claims court that can handle some civil cases. The judge on the court is elected to a term of four years and must be a member of the Indiana Bar Association. The judge is assisted by a constable who is elected to a four-year term. In some cases, court decisions can be appealed to the state level circuit court.

The county has other elected offices including sheriff, coroner, auditor, treasurer, recorder, surveyor and circuit court clerk. Each is elected to four-year terms. Members elected to county government positions are required to declare party affiliations and be residents of the county.

Each township has a trustee who administers rural fire protection and ambulance service, provides poor relief and manages cemetery care, among other duties. The trustee is assisted in these duties by a three-member township board. The trustees and board members are elected to four-year terms.

Montgomery County is part of Indiana's 4th congressional district; Indiana Senate district 23; and Indiana House of Representatives districts 28 and 41.

Education

K-12 schools
School districts include: Crawfordsville Community Schools, North Montgomery Community School Corporation, and South Montgomery Community School Corporation.

Libraries
Montgomery County is home to several Carnegie libraries. These libraries were built in the early 1900s by way of grants from Andrew Carnegie. All but one, the Crawfordsville District Public Library, is still in use today. The Crawfordsville Library was moved to a new location on South Washington Street in 2005 after the old building became too small for the growing collection. The old library building is now the home of the Carnegie Museum of Montgomery County, a museum dedicated to the history of Montgomery County. The other Carnegie libraries include the Waveland-Brown Township Public Library, the Darlington-Franklin Township Public Library, and the Linden-Madison Township Public Library. The Ladoga Clark Township Public Library is not housed in a Carnegie building.

Demographics

As of the 2010 United States Census, there were 38,124 people, 14,979 households, and 10,342 families in the county. The racial makeup of the county was 95.2% white, 0.9% black or African American, 0.6% Asian, 0.3% American Indian, 1.8% from other races, and 1.2% from two or more races. Those of Hispanic or Latino origin made up 4.6% of the population. In terms of ancestry, 22.6% were German, 16.5% were American, 14.4% were Irish, and 12.1% were English.

Of the 14,979 households, 33.0% had children under the age of 18 living with them, 53.2% were married couples living together, 10.4% had a female householder with no husband present, 31.0% were non-families, and 25.9% of all households were made up of individuals. The average household size was 2.47 and the average family size was 2.94. The median age was 39.4 years.

The median income for a household in the county was $47,697 and the median income for a family was $56,374. Males had a median income of $42,494 versus $30,280 for females. The per capita income for the county was $22,788. About 9.8% of families and 12.2% of the population were below the poverty line, including 19.7% of those under age 18 and 5.0% of those age 65 or over.

See also
 National Register of Historic Places listings in Montgomery County, Indiana

References

Further reading
 Morris, Ronald V. Yountsville: The Rise and Decline of an Indiana Mill Town (U of Notre Dame Press, 2019) online review

External links
 
 Crawfordsville District Public Library

 
Indiana counties
1823 establishments in Indiana
Populated places established in 1823